Puszcza Mariańska  is a village in Żyrardów County, Masovian Voivodeship, in east-central Poland. It is the seat of the gmina (administrative district) called Gmina Puszcza Mariańska.

References

Villages in Żyrardów County